Robert Kenneth Carr (1908–1979) was an American scholar in the field of government/political science. His main area of interest and expertise was in the field of civil liberties/civil rights, and he did the bulk of his writing while on the faculty of Dartmouth College. Carr also served as the executive secretary of President Harry S. Truman's Committee on Civil Rights and was the primary author of the committee's landmark report, To Secure These Rights  (1947), which spotlighted the need for more rigorous federal enforcement of civil rights. He served as president of Oberlin College from 1960–1970.

Biography 
Carr was born and raised in Cleveland, Ohio and graduated from Shaw High School. While in high school, he made a living by trapping. He went on to earn a bachelor's degree from Dartmouth College in 1929, and then did his graduate work at Harvard University, earning an M.A. in 1930 and a Ph.D. in 1935. While completing his doctoral studies, Carr taught at the University of Oklahoma Norman. He joined the department of government at Dartmouth in 1937 and remained there until 1960.

Carr served as the president of Oberlin College during a tumultuous period of student activism. Under his presidency, he increased the school's physical plant, with 15 new buildings completed. Under his leadership, student involvement in college affairs increased, with students serving on nearly all college committees as voting members (including the Board of Trustees). Despite these accomplishments, Carr clashed repeatedly with the students regarding issues related to the Vietnam War. He left office in 1969, with History professor Ellsworth C. Carlson taking over as acting President,  and was forced to resign as President in November 1970, succeeded by the 33-year-old Oberlin & Princeton alumnus Robert W. Fuller.

Bibliography

Author 
 The Supreme Court and Judicial Review (1942)
 Federal Protection of Civil Rights (1947)
 The House Committee on Un-American Activities (1952)

Co-author 
 American Democracy in Theory and Practice (1951, 1971) 
 Civil Liberties Under Attack (1953)
 Foundations of Freedom (1958)
 Aspects of Liberty (1958)

Notes

References

External links
 President Carr and Martin Luther King

1908 births
1979 deaths
Dartmouth College alumni
Harvard University alumni
University of Oklahoma faculty
Dartmouth College faculty
Presidents of Oberlin College
American political scientists
20th-century American academics
20th-century political scientists